Senga may refer to:

 Senga people, an ethnic tribe of Zambia and Mozambique
 Nsenga language, also spelled Chinsenga and Senga
 Senga, Zimbabwe in Gweru
 Senga, a Thoroughbred racehorse

People with the surname
, Japanese professional baseball player

Japanese-language surnames